The list of Lambda Chi Alpha brothers includes notable initiated and honorary members of Lambda Chi Alpha fraternity.

Founded at Boston University in Boston in 1909, Lambda Chi Alpha is one of the largest social fraternities in North America with over 300,000 lifetime members and active chapters and colonies at 195 universities in the United States, Canada, and Australia.

Academics

Artists and writers

Astronauts

Business

Comedians

Film and television

Government and politics

Law

Media

Military

Musicians

Sports

Baseball

Basketball

Bobsled

Football

Golf

Hydroplane racing

Professional wrestling

Rugby

Soccer

Swimming

Tennis

Volleyball

See also
Lambda Chi Alpha
List of Lambda Chi Alpha chapters

References

External links
 Famous Lambda Chi Alpha brothers at Notable Names Database
 Notable Lambda Chis, Lambda Chi Alpha Fraternity

Brothers
Lists of members of United States student societies